Rhythmologa is a genus of moths belonging to the subfamily Tortricinae of the family Tortricidae.

Species
Rhythmologa argentoviridana Razowski & Wojtusiak, 2008
Rhythmologa bicuspis Razowski & Wojtusiak, 2010
Rhythmologa numerata Meyrick, 1926
Rhythmologa polyfenestra Razowski & Wojtusiak, 2009
Rhythmologa yukipana Razowski & Pelz, 2003

See also
List of Tortricidae genera

References

 , 2005, World Catalogue of Insects 5
 , 1926, Exotic Microlepid. 3: 249.
 , 2009: Tortricidae (Lepidoptera) from the mountains of Ecuador and remarks on their geographical distribution. Part IV. Eastern Cordillera. Acta Zoologica Cracoviensia 51B (1-2): 119–187. doi:10.3409/azc.52b_1-2.119-187. Full article: .
 , 2010: Tortricidae (Lepidoptera) from Peru. Acta Zoologica Cracoviensia 53B (1-2): 73-159. . Full article: .

External links
Tortricid.net

Euliini
Tortricidae genera